The Women's 5 kilometre cross-country skiing event was part of the cross-country skiing programme at the 1992 Winter Olympics, in Albertville, France. It was the eighth appearance of the event. The competition was held on 13 February 1992, at Les Saisies.

Results

References

Women's cross-country skiing at the 1992 Winter Olympics
Women's 5 kilometre cross-country skiing at the Winter Olympics
Olymp
Cross